Llanos is a savanna and grassland region in Colombia and Venezuela.

Llanos, Spanish for 'plains', may also refer to:

Places
Llanos de Moxos or Beni savanna, a seasonally flooded savanna in Bolivia
Los Llanos de Aridane, a municipality on the Canary Islands
Los Llanos, Chile, a region in southern Chile
Llanos el Salado, a wetland basin in northern Mexico
Los Llanos, Herrera, a corregimiento in Panama
Llanos (Lena), a parish of Lena, Asturias, Spain
Llanos de Albacete, a comarca in Spain
Llanos, Aibonito, Puerto Rico, US
Los Llanos, Coamo, Puerto Rico, US
Llanos, Lajas, Puerto Rico, US
Venezuelan Llanos, a region of Venezuela

Other uses
Los Llanos Airport or Albacete Airport, an airport in Spain